Gammarus pulex is a species of amphipod crustacean found in fresh water across much of Europe.

Description
The adults have a robust appearance; they are typically greyish with markings in dark brown or green.

Individuals of the genus Dendrocometes are known to be parasites which reside on the gills of G. pulex.

Distribution
Gammarus pulex is found across most of Europe from the Volga drainage in the east to the British Isles in the west. It is absent from Norway, parts of Scotland, and Ireland, although it was introduced to Lough Neagh in the 1950s, where it is replacing the native Gammarus duebeni.

Taxonomic history
Gammarus pulex was one of the species included in the 10th edition of Carl Linnaeus' Systema Naturae, which marks the starting point for zoological nomenclature, in 1758. Linnaeus called the species Cancer pulex, the specific epithet  being Latin for "flea". His description was, however, vague, and could apply to "nearly every species of amphipod". Some of Linnaeus' references refer to freshwater species, while others refer to marine species. The application of the name was settled in 1970 by the redescription of the species and the selection of a neotype from a stream on the Swedish island of Öland.

The name Rivulogammarus has been used for a part of the genus Gammarus when it is split into smaller genera, and G. pulex has sometimes been called Rivulogammarus pulex. This name is, however, invalid under the International Code of Zoological Nomenclature, since G. pulex is the type species of the genus Gammarus, and the genus that contains it must therefore be named Gammarus.

Parasites
Gammarus pulex are known to be infected by at least three different species of acantocephalan parasites, Pomphorhynchus laevis, P. minutus, and P. tereticollis.

References

pulex
Freshwater crustaceans of Europe
Freshwater crustaceans of Asia
Crustaceans described in 1758
Taxa named by Carl Linnaeus